Cândido Mendes is a Brazilian municipality in the state of Maranhão. It has a population of 20,278 (2020) and an area of 1641 km2.

References

Populated coastal places in Maranhão
Municipalities in Maranhão